A Mammotome device is a vacuum-assisted breast biopsy (VAC) device that uses image guidance such as x-ray, ultrasound and/or MRI to perform breast biopsies. A biopsy using a Mammotome device can be done on an outpatient basis with a local anesthetic.

Indications
A stereotaxic macro-biopsy is often indicated after suspicious elements are seen on a mammography (mass, micro-calcifications or focal abnormal changes in the tissues). It is always used to analyse those elements but can sometimes also remove it completely. It is often used when:
 The mammography shows a suspicious solid mass.
 The mammography shows a suspicious "islet" of micro-calcifications.
 The breast tissue seems deformed.
 A new mass or micro-calcification islet is spotted in a zone previously targeted by surgery.

Risks associated with the procedure
Side effects:
 Common: bruising, mild discomfort during the procedure, mild bleeding and tenderness at the biopsy site.
 Rare: significant bleeding or pain during biopsy, significant tenderness and bleeding at the biopsy site.

Complications:
 Rare: Post-biopsy breast infection. Allergic reaction to the local anaesthetic.
Complications from biopsies can delay subsequent breast surgery.

The procedure may, rarely, fail due to inaccurate sampling of the lesion; results may underestimate the severity of the lesion although these risks do not differ from other biopsy or surgical procedures. Occasionally, even after a successful biopsy, the diagnosis may remain uncertain and require a surgical biopsy, especially when atypical or precancerous cells are found on core biopsy.

Limitations of the procedure
Lesions accompanied by diffuse calcium deposits scattered throughout the breast or located near the chest wall are difficult to target or evaluate by stereotactic biopsy. If the mammogram shows only a vague change in tissue density but no definite mass or nodule, the x-ray-guided method may not be successful.

External links 
 Mammotome entry in the public domain NCI Dictionary of Cancer Terms

References

Medical equipment
Breast cancer
Biopsy